Chartered Cost Accountant (CCA) is a cost accounting or cost control professional designation offered by the American Academy of Financial Management. The CCA is a Graduate Post Nominal (GPN) that is only available for accountants with an accredited degree, MBA, CPA, Chartered Accountant License, law degree, PhD or specialized executive training.

See also
 Accountant

External Board of Standards Links 
AAPM Amer. Academy of Financial Management

Management accounting
Accounting qualifications